4 gewinnt (pronounced Vier gewinnt) is the second album by German hip-hop group Die Fantastischen Vier. The name refers to the German version of the game Connect Four. The album peaked at position 3 in Austria, Germany and Switzerland.

Track listing

Personnel 
Thomas Dürr (Thomas D)
Michael "Smudo" Schmidt
Michael "Michi" Beck
Andreas "And.Ypsilon" Rieke

Production
Executive producer: Andreas Rieke
Co-producers: Klaus Scharff, Andreas "Bär" Läsker
Photo and cover artwork: I-D Büro

Singles

References

External links
 Official website (German)
 Discogs discography

1992 albums
Die Fantastischen Vier albums